The Raymond-Bradford Homestead is a historic house on Raymond Hill Road in Montville, Connecticut.  Built about 1710, it is notable for its history of alteration, dating into the late 19th century, its construction by a woman, Mercy Sands Raymond, in the colonial period, and its continuous ownership by a single family line.  The house was listed on the National Register of Historic Places on April 16, 1982.

Description and history
The Raymond-Bradford Homestead is located in a rural setting of central Montville at 999 Raymond Hill Rd, at the northern terminus of Oakdale Road. Connecticut Route 163 passes to the west and south.  It is a -story wood-frame structure, five bays wide, with a hip roof.  It has a center entrance, sheltered by a Victorian hood with decorative brackets, and a chimney placed off-center on the rear roof face.  The interior follows a central hall plan today, although it had a central chimney when built.

The house was built in stages, with the oldest portion dating to about 1710.  It was built on land purchased by Mercy Sands Raymond, a widow from Block Island, and James Merritt, apparently by Raymond, who managed a  farm with Merritt and her son Joshua until her death in 1741.  The first owner of the house was Mercy Sands Raymond. During her time on Block Island, Raymond is thought to have accommodated Captain Kidd and was paid handsomely for the help.

The house was substantially altered about 1820, adding Federal style features and changing the roof from a gable to a hip roof.  It was again restyled in the 1870s, when the central chimney was removed, and wood finishes more in keeping with Victorian tastes were installed.  Around this time the rear ell, housing the kitchen, was added.  At the time of its National Register listing in 1982, it was still in the hands of Raymond descendants.

See also
List of the oldest buildings in Connecticut
National Register of Historic Places listings in New London County, Connecticut

References

Houses on the National Register of Historic Places in Connecticut
Houses completed in 1710
Montville, Connecticut
Houses in New London County, Connecticut
National Register of Historic Places in New London County, Connecticut
1710 establishments in Connecticut